Curlew Lake may refer to any of several locations the United States:

Lakes

Curlew Lake (Alaska)
Curlew Lake (New Mexico)
Curlew Lake (South Dakota)
Curlew Lake (Washington)

Curlew Lake may also refer to:
Curlew Lake Resources